Síol Anmchadha was a sub-kingdom or lordship of Uí Maine, and ruled by an offshoot of the Uí Maine called the Síol Anmchadha ("the seed of Anmchadh"), from whom the territory took its name. It was located in Connacht, Ireland.

History
At its largest extent, the Kings of Síol Anmchadha ruled all the land on the west shore of Lough Derg (Shannon) as far south as Thomond; the land between the Shannon and Suck rivers; and a corridor of land, known as Lusmagh, across the Shannon in Munster, in the direction of Birr.

The ruling dynasty later took the surname Ó Madadháin, anglicised as Maddan or Madden. In the later medieval era they were sometime vassals of the Earls of Ulster and their successors, The Clanricardes.

Legacy
In 1651, after the area had been incorporated into the Kingdom of Ireland, land belonging to the Madden, Kelly, Burke and other families was appropriated during the Cromwellian conquest of Ireland. In particular, the English brothers John Eyre and Edward Eyre took much land. "Eyrecourt" in the area is named after them (it was originalled called Dún an Uchta) and their descendant became Baron Eyre.

The name Síol Anmchadha survives to the present day in the placename Baile Mór Síol Anmchadha, the Irish language version of Lawrencetown, County Galway.

Local placenames
 Tynagh
 Portumna
 Eyrecourt
 Woodford, County Galway

See also
 Kings of Síol Anmchadha
 Uí Maine
 Clann Fhergail
 Uí Fiachrach Aidhne
 Clann Taidg
 Conmhaícne Mara
 Muintir Murchada
 Trícha Máenmaige
 Uí Díarmata

References
 O'Madáin: History of the O'Maddens of Hy-Many, Gerard Madden, 2004. .
 The Colahans - A Remarkable Galway Family, Diarmuid Ó Cearbhaill, Journal of the Galway Archaeological and Historical Society, volume 54, 2002, pp. 121–140.
 Medieval Ireland: Territorial, Political and Economic Divisions, Paul MacCotter, Four Courts Press, 2008, pp. 133–134.

External links
 https://archive.org/stream/tribescustomsofh00odonuoft/tribescustomsofh00odonuoft_djvu.txt

History of County Galway
Connacht
Geography of County Galway
Kingdoms of medieval Ireland